The Mexican Plateau horned lizard (Phrynosoma orbiculare) is a species of horned lizard in the family Phrynosomatidae. The species, also known commonly as the Chihuahua Desert horned lizard, is endemic to Mexico. There are five recognized subspecies. The specific epithet, orbiculare, comes from the Latin adjective orbis, meaning "circular".

Description

P. orbiculare has a characteristic single row of lateral abdominal fringe scales. This "horned toad" also has two short occipital horns.

Geographic range
P. orbiculare is found only in the high plateau country of central Mexico. Specifically, it is found in the Mexican states of Chihuahua, Durango, Morelos, Nuevo León, Puebla, and Veracruz.

Habitat
P. orbiculare occurs in a wide range of primary habitats (dry scrubland, pine-oak forest, oak forest, juniper forest) and secondary habitats (agricultural land, and agave and Opuntia fields).

Subspecies
Five subspecies of P. orbiculare are recognized as being valid, including the nominotypical subspecies.
Phrynosoma orbiculare bradti 
Phrynosoma orbiculare cortezii 
Phrynosoma orbiculare dugesii 
Phrynosoma orbiculare orbiculare 
Phrynosoma orbiculare orientale 

Nota bene: A trinomial authority in parentheses indicates that the subspecies was originally described in a genus other than Phrynosoma.

Reproduction
P. orbicularis is viviparous.

Etymology
The subspecific name, cortezii, is in honor of Spanish conquistador Hernán Cortés.

The subspecific name, dugesii, is in honor of French-born Mexican naturalist Alfredo Dugès, who is considered the "father" of Mexican herpetology.

References

Further reading
Boulenger GA (1885). Catalogue of the Lizards in the British Museum (Natural History). Second Edition. Volume II. Iguanidæ ... London: Trustees of the British Museum (Natural History). (Taylor and Francis, printers). xiii + 497 pp. + Plates I-XXIV. (Phrynosoma orbiculare, pp. 241–243).
Horowitz SB (1955). "An arrangement of the subspecies of the horned toad, Phrynosoma orbiculare (Iguanidae)". American Midland Naturalist 54 (1): 204–218. (Phrynosoma orbiculare bradti, new subspecies; P. orbiculare orientale, new subspecies).
Linnaeus C (1758). Systema naturæ per regna tria naturæ, secundum classes, ordines, genera, species, cum characteribus, differentiis, synonymis, locis. Tomus I. Editio Decima, Reformata. Stockholm: L. Salvius. 824 pp. (Lacerta orbicularis, new species, p. 206). (in Latin).

Phrynosoma
Endemic reptiles of Mexico
Reptiles described in 1758
Taxa named by Carl Linnaeus
Mexican Plateau